Benoît Ladrière (born 27 April 1987) is a Belgian footballer who plays for Châtelet as a defensive midfielder.

Club career
Ladrière made his senior debuts with hometown's La Louvière in Jupiler Pro League, but left the club in May 2008, signing with Gent a season later. After failing to feature with the first-team he moved to Tubize.

On 1 July 2012 Ladrière joined Waasland-Beveren, returning to the top division. He was released a season later.

In November 2013 Ladrière went on a trial at Serie B side Avellino, only signing with the Biancoverdi a month later.

In August 2015, he returned to Belgium and signed with the Belgian second division club Patro Eisden.

References

External links

 Benoît Ladrière Interview

1987 births
Living people
Association football midfielders
Belgian footballers
R.A.A. Louviéroise players
K.A.A. Gent players
A.F.C. Tubize players
S.K. Beveren players
Belgian Pro League players
Serie B players
U.S. Avellino 1912 players
People from La Louvière
R. Châtelet S.C. players
Footballers from Hainaut (province)